Bussink is a surname. Notable people with the surname include:

Astrid Bussink (born 1975), Dutch filmmaker
Ronald Bussink, Ferris wheel designer